Portanova is a shopping center in the western part of Osijek, a city in eastern Croatia.According to the International Council of Shopping Centers, Portanova has a size of  with  of gross leasable area (GLA). This area serves as a regional center and has a catchment population including parts of Croatia as well as Hungary, Bosnia and Herzegovina, and Serbia.

History 

The initial concept and planning for building a center began in 2007, with the site development work beginning on the 15th of May 2009 after all permits were granted.

The financial investor in Portanova shopping center is Amplitudo d.o.o., and multiple teams from different companies carried out the development work. Teams that were involved in the project include CBRE, Mace Grup Ltd, Studio XXL, Chapman Taylor Architetti and Gradnja (from Osijek). When Portanova shopping center opened its doors to the public on March 24, 2011, it was the sixth largest shopping center in Croatia.

The name of the center, Portanova or “new door” reflects a term that is based on the both the local environment and the site's location on the western entrance to the City of Osijek.

The center has been designed with three levels (two of which are for commercial and retail use with the remaining one for leisure use). There are just over 1,600 free parking spaces located at the site, split between the center's underground garage parking, the land surrounding the center and on the center's roof.

Architecture 

The building was constructed mostly from concrete and steel, utilising dark brown concrete panels and copper metal sheets which are contrasted with white colored cement sheets.

The main vision for the project was to develop a sculptural building that will integrate into the urban landscape, while presenting a high visual impact in accordance with the principles of contemporary minimalistic architecture.

The building takes the shape of an enormous rock set on the ground. The entrances are located in areas where it appears as though pieces of the rock-face have been broken off. The cuts in the rock define 3 distinct volumes linked together by the shopping malls, the core of the building.

Interior 
The malls on the ground and first floor link two piazzas where the entrances and vertical connections (e.g. elevators) are situated leading to the shops and anchor stores.

Due to the design, every unit in the center has a high shop front and an equal width proportional to its area. In addition, the longitudinal shape of the building ensures that every shop is oriented towards the central area of the mall, making it easy for visitors to find every store in the center.

Shops 
While there are a wide range of retail establishments within Portanova, some anchor tenants that distinguish themselves from other tenants include Konzum Hypermarket, H&M, Müller, Zara, C&A, NewYorker and Blitz-Cinestar multiplex cinema. The Blitz-Cinestar cinema is part of the entertainment section which is located on the second floor and also contains a bowling alley, casino and gastronomy services.

Location 
Portanova is also readily accessible via the southern bypass and access roads, which enables almost 600,000 people to reach the center with a one-hour drive.

The shopping center is located in the Osijek metropolitan area which makes it is accessible from all of eastern Slavonia and Baranja, including the cities of Valpovo away, Belišće, Beli Manastir, Vinkovci, Vukovar and Našice.

See also 
 International Council of Shopping Centers

References

External links 

 
 Cinestar Osijek

Shopping malls in Croatia
Buildings and structures in Osijek
2011 establishments in Croatia
Shopping malls established in 2011
Tourist attractions in Osijek-Baranja County
Economy of Osijek